Enteromius owenae is a species of cyprinid fish in the genus Enteromius which occurs in Lake Bangweulu and the Chambezi River in Zambia.

Footnotes 

 

Enteromius
Fish described in 1943
Taxa named by Kate Bertram